Anil Kakodkar (born 11 November 1943) is an Indian nuclear physicist and mechanical engineer. He was the chairman of the Atomic Energy Commission of India and the Secretary to the Government of India, he was the Director of the Bhabha Atomic Research Centre, Trombay from 1996 to 2000. He was awarded the Padma Vibhushan, India's second highest civilian honour, on 26 January 2009.

Apart from playing a major role in India's nuclear tests asserting sovereignty, Kakodkar champions India's self-reliance on thorium as a fuel for nuclear energy.

Early life
Kakodkar was born on 11 November 1943 in Barwani princely state (present day Madhya Pradesh state) to Kamala Kakodkar and Purushottam Kakodkar, both Gandhian freedom fighters. He had his early education at Barwani and at Khargone, until moving to Mumbai for post-matriculation studies.

Kakodkar graduated from Ruparel College, then from VJTI, University of Mumbai with a degree in Mechanical Engineering in 1963. He joined the Bhabha Atomic Research Centre (BARC) in 1964. He obtained a master's degree in experimental stress analysis from the University of Nottingham in 1969.

Career
He joined the Reactor Engineering Division of the BARC and played a key role in design and construction of the Dhruva reactor, a completely original but high-tech project. He was a part of the core team of architects of India's Peaceful Nuclear Tests in 1974 and 1998. Further he has led the indigenous development in India's Pressurised Heavy Water Reactor Technology. He worked in the rehabilitation of the two reactors at Kalpakkam and the first unit at Rawatbhata, which at one stage were on the verge of being written off.

In 1996 he became Director of the BARC and since 2000 he has been leading the Atomic Energy Commission of India and also is the secretary of the Department of Atomic Energy. He has published over 250 scientific papers.

He believes that India should be self-reliant in energy, especially by use of the cheap national thorium resources. He continues to engage in designing the Advanced Heavy Water Reactor, that uses thorium-uranium 233 as the primary energy source with plutonium as the driver fuel. The unique reactor system, with simplified but safe technology, will generate 75 per cent of electricity from thorium.

Other positions

 Kakodkar is a member of many boards, commissions, and other organizations. Some of them are:

 Chairman, Board of Governors of the Indian Institute of Technology, Bombay – 2006–15.
 Chairman, Board of Directors of Maharashtra Knowledge Corporation Limited, Pune (current).
 Member, Atomic Energy Commission
 Member, ONGC Energy Centre Trust
 Chairman, empowered committee on IIT reforms
 Presently  updated April-2014 he is serving as a director on the central board of Reserve Bank of India.
He is a Fellow of the Indian National Academy of Engineering and served as its president during 1999–2000.
He is a Fellow of the Indian Academy of Sciences, the National Academy of Sciences, India and the Maharashtra Academy of Sciences.
He is a member of the—International Nuclear Energy Academy and Honorary member of the World Innovation Foundation. He was member of the International Nuclear Safety Advisory Group (INSAG) during 1999–2002
He is on the board of Governors of VJTI, Mumbai
He will head Rail safety committee as per Rail budget speech by Railway Minister in 2012
He is chairman Rajiv Gandhi Science and Technology Commission, Government of Maharashtra, Mantralaya, Mumbai.
He is chairman of steering and monitoring committee of Biomedical Engineering and Technology (incubation) Centre, a network of 11 engineering and medical institutes for medical device innovation.
He is chairperson of Dr. B R Ambedkar National Institute of Technology, Jalandhar.
He is Chairman of Maharashtra Knowledge Corporation Limited

Awards

National awards
Padma Shri in 1998
Padma Bhushan in 1999
Padma Vibhushan in 2009

Other awards
Highest civilian award of the Maharashtra state-Maharashtra Bhushan Award (2011–2012)
Highest civilian award of the Goa state-Gomant Vibhushan Award (2010)
Hari Om Ashram Prerit Vikram Sarabhai Award (1988)
H. K. Firodia Award for Excellence in Science and Technology (1997)
Rockwell Medal for Excellence in Technology (1997)
FICCI Award for outstanding contribution to Nuclear Science and Technology (1997–98)
ANACON – 1998 Life Time Achievement Award for Nuclear Sciences
Indian Science Congress Association's H. J. Bhabha Memorial Award (1999–2000)
Godavari Gaurav Award (2000)
Dr. Y. Nayudamma Memorial Award (2002)
Chemtech Foundation's Achiever of the Year Award for Energy (2002)
Gujar Mal Modi Innovative Science and Technology Award in 2004.
Homi Bhabha Lifetime Achievement Award 2010.
Acharya Varahmihir Award (2004) by Varahmihir Institute of Scientific Heritage and Research, Ujjain (M.P.), India

References

External links
Biography
Atomic Energy Commission of India
MKCL

1943 births
Living people
Marathi people
University of Mumbai alumni
Alumni of the University of Nottingham
Indian mechanical engineers
nuclear physicists
Engineers from Madhya Pradesh
Fellows of the Indian Academy of Sciences
Indian nuclear physicists
Recipients of the Padma Bhushan in science & engineering
Recipients of the Padma Vibhushan in science & engineering
 physicists
Recipients of the Padma Shri in science & engineering
Recipients of the Maharashtra Bhushan Award
Mechanical engineers
20th-century Indian engineers
People from Barwani